Bill Ray may refer to:

 Bill Ray (bishop) (born 1950), Anglican bishop of North Queensland in Australia
 Bill Ray (politician) (1922–2013), American businessman, politician, and writer
 Bill Ray (photojournalist) (1936–2020), photojournalist

See also  
 William Ray (disambiguation)
 Billy Ray (disambiguation)